A chalk outline is a temporary outline drawn on the ground outlining evidence at a crime scene. The outline provides context for photographs of the crime scene, and assists investigators in preserving the evidence. Modern investigators almost never use chalk or tape as outlines at a crime scene to avoid contaminating the evidence. Although rare in modern investigations, they have become a literary trope in popular culture.

Form
Classically, white or bright yellow chalk is used, although some may use paint or white tape. In the case of a body, a chalk outline might be drawn immediately before the body is to be removed, but after the medical examiner has examined the body.

Chalk outlines in practice were typically rough shapes of the body's position and did not include specific arms and leg orientation.<ref>See, e.g., Life Magazine, "'Clean-up Week' on Docks", May 18, 1953, page 40.

History and modern use
While chalk outlines were occasionally used in the past, they often were drawn by the police for press photographers, not for investigative purposes. It allowed the press to take a picture and represent the scene without the gruesomeness of a body.

Some sources indicate that while not part of official procedure, some uninformed investigators may occasionally draw outlines, particularly in non-homicide accidents. The term "chalk fairy" is occasionally used to describe an officer that makes the chalk outline, often without authorization and while unwittingly contaminating the scene.

While the use of chalk is uncommon, investigators may make smaller marks, or use removable flags, index cards, or even markers, to indicate important positions, particularly if other references are not available.

In popular culture

Chalk outlines of bodies are familiar tropes in popular culture. Often they are used in humorous ways depicting awkward positioning or meticulous precision, or portending a character's impending death by having them prematurely fall into a drawn outline. The Naked Gun'' series made extensive use of the prop, as have a number of other comedies.

More generally the term has become synonymous with tragic death and has been used in literature, music, and visual arts. Some author guides have listed the procedure as standard.

References

External links

 TV Tropes entry, including a list of incidences
 Straight Dope column on chalk outlines

Criminal investigation
Outline, chalk